The Hyundai Accent WRC is a World Rally Car built for the Hyundai Castrol World Rally Team by Motor Sport Developments to compete in the World Rally Championship. It is based upon the Hyundai Accent road car, and was debuted at the 2000 Rally Sweden.

Competition history

Accent WRC competed in an official capacity, spawning three generations, in the World Rally Championship from 2000 to 2003. After development and testing in 1999, the Hyundai World Rally Team and Motor Sport Developments (MSD) debuted the Accent WRC at the 2000 Swedish Rally. The second evolution, Accent WRC2, featured revised aerodynamics, active front differential, longer suspension travel and improved suspension top mounts, although most of the attention was directed at improving reliability. Like its predecessor's, the car's best result in a WRC event remained a fourth place. The Accent WRC3, featuring new dampers and engine internals among other changes, debuted at the 2002 Tour de Corse.

The car, though, in such capable hands across its lifespan as the four-time world champion Juha Kankkunen, ex-Subaru rally-winning and former Group A champion Kenneth Eriksson and former British Rally Champion Alister McRae, albeit the former two in the twilight of their careers, was reasonably competitive at times and showed some promise. Belgian Freddy Loix and 1991 Rally Catalunya winner Armin Schwarz were among the other drivers so long synonymous with life in the works-fettled Accents.

Due to budget constraints, the car's development was virtually halted during the 2003 season. In September, Hyundai announced its withdrawal from the WRC.

Gallery

References

External links

 

World Rally Cars
Accent WRC
All-wheel-drive vehicles